Nduka Morrisson Ozokwo (born 25 December 1988) is a Nigerian footballer who most recently played for Ankaragücü in the Turkish Süper Lig.

Club career 
Born in Enugu, Nigeria, Ozokwo began his career at local side Enugu Rangers. He moved to French outfit OGC Nice, signing a one-year contract shortly before the transfer window for summer 2007 closed. At the Côte d'Azur club he played alongside compatriot Onyekachi Apam, also a former Enugu Rangers player.

Nice choose not to renew his contract in the summer of 2009, so Ozokwo returned to Enugu Rangers for the remainder of the year.

In January 2010, he joined TFF First League side Boluspor on a six-month contract.

International career 
Represented his country in the 2007 African Youth Championship where his team were runners up to Congo. 

Following this he captained the side in the 2007 U-20 World Cup in Canada where he wore the number nine shirt as the team exited in the quarter-finals.

References

External links 
Profile on ESPN

Nduka Ozokwo at Soccerway

1988 births
Living people
Association football midfielders
Nigerian footballers
Nigeria under-20 international footballers
Rangers International F.C. players
OGC Nice players
Boluspor footballers
Mersin İdman Yurdu footballers
Adanaspor footballers
Ligue 1 players
Süper Lig players
TFF First League players
Nigerian expatriate footballers
Expatriate footballers in France
Expatriate footballers in Turkey
Nigerian expatriate sportspeople in France
Nigerian expatriate sportspeople in Turkey
Footballers from Enugu State
Footballers from Enugu